Il-Arslan ("The Lion") (full name: Taj ad-Dunya wa ad-Din Abul-Fath Il-Arslan ibn Atsiz, Persian: تاج الدین ابوالفتح ایل ارسلان بن اتسز) (died March 1172) was the Shah of Khwarezm from 1156 until 1172. He was the son of Atsïz.

Reign 
In 1152 Il-Arslan was made governor of Jand, an outpost on the Syr Darya which had recently been reconquered, by his father. In 1156 Atsïz died and Il-Arslan succeeded him as Khwarazm-Shah. Like his father, he decided to pay tribute to both the Seljuk sultan Sanjar and the Qara Khitai gurkhan.

Sanjar died only a few months after Il-Arslan's ascension, causing Seljuk Khurasan to descend into chaos. This allowed Il-Arslan to effectively break off Seljuk suzerainty, although he remained on friendly terms with Sanjar's successor, Mas'ud. They were alleged to have attempted to create a joint campaign against the Qara Khitai, but such an alliance never occurred. Like his father, Il-Arslan sought to expand his influence in Khurasan, and in the 1160s took an active interest in the area by supplying armies to local allies, but despite the collapse of central Seljuk authority in that area, he was unable to make any significant headway against the regional rulers.

In 1158 Il-Arslan became involved in the affairs of another Qara Khitai vassal state, the Karakhanids of Samarkand. The Karakhanid Chaghrï Khan had been persecuting the Qarluks in his realm, and several Qarluk leaders fled to Khwarazm and sought Il-Arslan's help. He responded by invading the Karakhnid dominions, taking Bukhara and besieging Samarkand, where Chaghrï Khan had taken refuge. The latter appealed to both the Turks of the Syr Darya and the Qara Khitai, and the gurkhan sent an army, but its commander hesitated to enter into conflict with the Khwarazmis. In the end a peace was mediated where Chaghrï Khan was forced to take back the Qarluk leaders and restore them to their former positions.

In 1172 the Qara Khitai launched a punitive expedition against Il-Arslan, who had not paid the required annual tribute. The shah collected his army but soon became sick and turned over his forces to one of his lieutenants. The Khwarazmi army was defeated, however, and Il-Arslan died shortly after. Following his death the state briefly became embroiled in turmoil, as the succession was disputed between his sons Tekish and Sultan Shah.

Court life 
Little is known about the court life at Gurganj under Il-Arslan. It was likely a continuation of the prospering milieu that had existed during his father's reign, with the secretary and poet Rashid al-Din Vatvat continuing to serve as the head of the chancery.

References

Sources
Biran, Michael. The Empire of the Qara Khitai in Eurasian History: Between China and the Islamic World. Cambridge, UK: Cambridge University Press, 2005.
 
Boyle, J. A. . The Cambridge History of Iran Volume 5: The Saljuq and Mongol Periods. Cambridge, UK: Cambridge University Press, 1968.

1172 deaths
Khwarezmid rulers
Year of birth unknown
12th-century Turkic people
Anushtegin dynasty